Novosibirsk Time was historically MSK+4. When Novosibirsk Oblast including the city of Novosibirsk changed to MSK+3, the MSK+4 time started to be called Krasnoyarsk Time.

The MSK+3 time was known as Omsk Time before the change and still is so.

In 2016, according to the Federal Law ФЗ-216 signed by president Putin on July 3, 2016 the Novosibirsk Time returns to MSK+4. The law takes effect July 24, 2016 at 2:00. The clock will need to be set an hour ahead - that is, 3 o'clock in the morning.

See also
 Time in Russia

References 

Time zones
Time in Russia